Picornavirales is an order of viruses with vertebrate, invertebrate, protist and plant hosts.  The name has a dual etymology.  First, picorna- is an acronym for poliovirus, insensitivity to ether, coxsackievirus, orphan virus, rhinovirus, and ribonucleic acid.  Secondly, pico-, meaning extremely small, combines with RNA to describe these very small RNA viruses. The order comprises viruses that historically are referred to as picorna-like viruses.

Characteristics
The families within this order share a number of common features:
 The virions are non-enveloped, icosahedral, and about 30 nanometers in diameter.
 The capsid has a "pseudo T=3" structure, and is composed of 60 protomers each made of three similar-sized but nonidentical beta barrels.
 The genome is made of one or a few single-stranded RNA(s) serving directly as mRNA, without overlapping open reading frames.
 The genome has a small protein, VPg, covalently attached to its 5' end, and usually a poly-adenylated 3' end.
 Each genome RNA is translated into polyprotein(s) yielding mature viral proteins through one or several virus-encoded proteinase(s).
 A hallmark of the Picornavirales is a conserved module of sequence domains, Hel-Pro-Pol, which is typical of (from the amino- to the carboxy-end of the polyprotein): 
 A helicase belonging to superfamily III
 [the VPg is encoded between these two domains]
 A chymotrypsin-like protease where the catalytic residue is typically a cysteine rather than a serine,
 A polymerase belonging to superfamily I; this conserved module is a hallmark of the Picornavirales
The evolution of picorna-like viruses seems to have antedated the separation of eukaryotes into the extant crown groups.

Taxonomy

The following families are recognized:
Caliciviridae
Dicistroviridae
Iflaviridae
Marnaviridae
Picornaviridae
Polycipiviridae
Secoviridae
Solinviviridae

References

External links
ICTV's last release of virus taxonomy
UniProt Taxonomy

 
Animal virology
Virus orders
Riboviria